Mongua is a town and municipality in Sugamuxi Province in the Colombian Department of Boyacá. The municipality borders Gámeza, Socotá, Pisba, Labranzagrande, Aquitania, Sogamoso, Monguí and Tópaga.

History 
In the centuries before the arrival of the Spanish conquistadors, the central highlands of Colombia (Altiplano Cundiboyacense) were inhabited by the Muisca. Mongua was part of the rule of the iraca of Sugamuxi. According to the Muisca religion, the messenger god Bochica traveled to Gámeza and took shelter in a cave called Toy´ña. The cacique of Mongua brought him gifts in the cave.

Mongua in the Chibcha language of the Muisca means either "bath on the hill", or "land of the rising Sun".

Economy 
Main economical activities in Mongua are agriculture (predominantly potatoes) and coal mining.

Gallery

References 

Municipalities of Boyacá Department
Populated places established in 1977
Muisca Confederation
Muysccubun